Starkovo is a rural locality (a village) in Tregubovskoye Rural Settlement, Velikoustyugsky District, Vologda Oblast, Russia. The population was 81 as of 2002.

Geography 
Starkovo is located 20 km southwest of Veliky Ustyug (the district's administrative centre) by road. Shchekino is the nearest rural locality.

References 

Rural localities in Velikoustyugsky District